Santosh Pariyar is a Nepalese politician, belonging to the Rastriya Swatantra Party. He is currently serving as the member of the 2nd Federal Parliament of Nepal. In the 2022 Nepalese general election he was elected as a proportional representative from the Dalit people category.

References

Living people
Nepal MPs 2022–present
Year of birth missing (living people)